Jan Mikael Håfström is a Swedish film director and screenwriter. He is best known for the 2003 film Evil, and the movie adaptation of Stephen King's short story 1408.

Early life
Born in Lund, Sweden, Mikael Håfström studied film at the University of Stockholm and the School of Visual Arts.

Career
Håfström's 2003 film Evil was nominated for the Academy Award for Best Foreign Language Film at the 76th Academy Awards. His slasher film, Drowning Ghost, screened at the 2004 Cannes Film Market.

In 2005, Håfström directed Derailed, which starred Clive Owen and Jennifer Aniston.

Håfström directed 1408, a horror film based on the Stephen King short story of the same name and starring John Cusack, in 2007. He collaborated with Cusack again in Shanghai, which premiered at the 2010 Shanghai International Film Festival.

He directed The Rite, an exorcism thriller film starring Anthony Hopkins, in 2011. His 2013 film, Escape Plan, starred Arnold Schwarzenegger and Sylvester Stallone.

In 2013, it was announced that Håfström will direct a film adaptation of Tunnels. In November 2021, it was announced he would direct the sci-fi film Slingshot.

Filmography
Films

Television

References

External links
 
 

Living people
People from Lund
Swedish film directors
Swedish screenwriters
Swedish male screenwriters
Horror film directors
Best Screenplay Guldbagge Award winners
Year of birth missing (living people)